Joemon Joshy (born 2 September 1988) is a Malayalam film/television actor. He started his film career as a child artist. Joemon made his acting debut in Puraskaram a 1999 Malayalam language children's film. Joemon has played a variety of roles.

Biography
Joemon Joshy finished his schooling from C.M.E Public School at Ochanthuruth and Little Flower High School at Narakkal. Joemon graduated in Journalism from Bharata Mata College, Thrikkakara in Ernakulam.

He began his acting profession as a child artist.

He debuted with the role of Vinu with the movie Puraskaram directed by K.P Venu in 1999.

He acted in Sahayathrikakku Snehapoorvam, Rakshasa Rajavu, Meerayude Dukhavum Muthuvinte Swapnavum and Chronic Bachelor.

In 2010, he worked movies in adult roles such as Pokkiri Raja, Kandahar, Pusthakam, Omega.exe, Thilothamma, Bhaskar The Rascal, Kamuki

Aside from films, he also acted in the serials Kayamkulam Kochunni in 2004 and Velakkani Mathavu in 2007.

He acted as Nandhu in the serial 4 the People broadcast in Asianet.

Filmography

Television serials

References

https://www.manoramaonline.com/movies/movie-news/2019/12/05/jomon-joshy-turn-to-hero-99-street.html

https://www.eastcoastdaily.com/movie/2019/12/05/jomon-joshy-turn-to-hero-99-street/

https://malayalam.filmibeat.com/news/jomon-joshy-turn-to-hero-057704.html

https://www.expresskerala.com/jomon-joshyturn-to-herosandeep-movie99-streetfacebook-post.html

https://malayalam.samayam.com/malayalam-cinema/celebrity-news/joemon-joshy-who-acted-as-gopi-in-pokkiriraja-speaks-about-madhuraraja/articleshow/68864589.cms
 https://www.nettv4u.com/celebrity/malayalam/movie-actor/joemon-joshy
 https://www.azhimukham.com/social-wire-actor-joemon-joshy-s-facebook-post-about-his-film-phantom/amp/
 https://www.99doing.com/joemonjoshy
 http://www.filmilive.com/celebrity/joemon-joshy.html
 http://malayalam.cinemaprofile.com/actor/joemon-joshy-malayalam-actor-biography-exclusive-online.html#sthash.OObz8wfx.dpbs
 http://www.doolnews.com/chronic-bachelor-boy-grown-up-845.html
 http://www.mangalam.com/news/detail/2/130921-personality.html
 http://actorjoemonjoshy.page.tl/
 http://cinetrooth.in/2016/02/09/joemon-joshy-actor-profile-and-biography/
 http://www.cochintalkies.com/celebrity/joemon-joshy.html
 https://www.moovrika.com/a/43517

1988 births
Living people
Male actors in Malayalam cinema
Indian male film actors
Male actors from Kochi
21st-century Indian male actors
Indian male television actors
Male actors in Malayalam television